In industrial chemistry, carboalkoxylation is a process for converting alkenes to esters.  This reaction is a form of carbonylation.  A closely related reaction is hydrocarboxylation, which employs water in place of alcohols

A commercial application is the carbomethoxylation of ethylene to give methyl propionate:
C2H4  +  CO  +  MeOH   →   MeO2CC2H5
The process is catalyzed by Pd[C6H4(CH2PBu-t)2]2.  Under similar conditions, other Pd-diphosphines catalyze formation of polyethyleneketone.

Methyl propionate ester is a precursor to methyl methacrylate, which is used in plastics and adhesives.

Carboalkoxylation has been incorporated into various telomerization schemes.  For example carboalkoxylation has been coupled with the dimerization of 1,3-butadiene. This step produces a doubly unsaturated C9-ester:
2CH2=CH-CH=CH2  +  CO +  CH3OH → CH2=CH(CH2)3CH=CHCH2CO2CH3

Hydroesterification
Related to carboalkoxylation is hydroesterification, the insertion of alkenes and alkynes into the H-O bond of carboxylic acids.  Vinyl acetate is produced industrially by the addition of acetic acid to acetylene in the presence of zinc acetate catalysts: Presently, zinc acetate is used as the catalyst:

References

Chemical reactions
Carbon monoxide